Oosterzele is a municipality located in the Flemish province of East Flanders, in Belgium. In 2021, Oosterzele had a total population of 13,740. The total area is 43.12 km². Its twin town is Oberkirch in Germany.

Geography
Oosterzele is subdivided into 6 sub-municipalities:

Famous inhabitants
Els De Temmerman, journalist, activist
Johan Van Hecke, politician
Gustaaf Joos, Roman Catholic cardinal
Frans Van De Velde (1909-2002), missionary
Gerard Vekeman (1933), poet
Walter Muls (1961), politician
Tom De Sutter (1985), football player
Johan Taeldeman, linguist, dialectologist, professor-emeritus UGent

References

External links

 Official website 

Municipalities of East Flanders
Populated places in East Flanders